Yeshivat Lev HaTorah is a Religious Zionist yeshiva, located in Ramat Shilo, a sub-district of Ramat Bet Shemesh, Israel.

Notable alumni

 Adam Edelman (born 1991), American-born four-time Israeli National Champion in skeleton event, and Israeli Olympian

References

External links
Official site
Info page on Lev from Yeshiva University

Educational institutions established in 2002
Lev HaTorah
Beit Shemesh
2002 establishments in Israel